ACTECO is an automobile engine brand created by Chery Automobile of China.  Engines range in size from 800 cc to 4.0 L, with architectures including a straight-4 and V8.  The range was developed with Austrian company AVL.

Founded in 1997, Chery Powertrain Division is affiliated with Chery Automobile Co. and provides all the powertrains in the Chery range of vehicles.

In November, 2006, Fiat announced that it would use Chery-produced 1.6 L and 1.8 L ACTECO engines starting with the Fiat Linea.

John Deere uses Chery engines in their XUV Gator model 825i and 590i (2 cylinder, EFI DOHC).

The petrol version of the Moke revival uses a 1.1-liter (1,083 cc SQR472F I4),  four-cylinder powertrain built by ACTECO.

References

External links

Automobile engines
Chery